Jenks may refer to:

Places
Holland Jenks House, Florida
Jenks Lake, California
Jenks, Oklahoma
Jenks Public Schools, a public school system located in Jenks, Oklahoma
Jenks, West Virginia
Jenks Township, Forest County, Pennsylvania
John Story Jenks School, a school located in Pennsylvania

People
Denis "Jenks" Jenkinson, motor racing journalist
Alden Jenks, composer
Andrew Jenks, American filmmaker
Arthur Whipple Jenks, Christian theologian
Bobby Jenks, professional baseball player
Cynthia Jenks, American physical chemist
Daisy Jenks, English videographer
Frank Jenks, actor
Frederick L. Jenks, professor emeritus at Florida State University
George A. Jenks, 19th-century Pennsylvania politician
George C. Jenks, author of first The Shadow story under pen name Frank S. Lawton
George F. Jenks, 20th-century cartographer
Jenks natural breaks optimization, the data classification system he designed
Jeremiah Jenks, professor
Michael Hutchinson Jenks, 19th-century Pennsylvania politician
Silvester Jenks, Catholic priest
Stephen Jenks, composer
William J. Jenks, 20th century railroad businessman

Fictional characters
 Darryl Jenks, a character in the 1988 American romantic comedy film Coming to America

See also
 Jencks (disambiguation)
 Jenckes, a surname